Carlos García Cuevas (born 3 July 1957) is a Mexican former footballer. He competed in the men's tournament at the 1976 Summer Olympics and won a gold medal in football at the 1975 Pan American Games.

References

External links
 

1957 births
Living people
Mexican footballers
Mexico international footballers
Olympic footballers of Mexico
Footballers at the 1976 Summer Olympics
Place of birth missing (living people)
Association football midfielders
Pan American Games gold medalists for Mexico
Pan American Games medalists in football
Footballers at the 1975 Pan American Games
Medalists at the 1975 Pan American Games